Sanghapala (506–518 CE) was a famous Khmer monk who traveled to Southern and Northern Dynasties China.

He, along with the fellow Funan monk, Mandrasena, translated Buddhist scriptures to Chinese.

See also
List of Buddhists

References

506 births
518 deaths
Northern and Southern dynasties Buddhist monks
Cambodian Buddhist monks
People of Funan